Beware of Blondes (French: Méfiez-vous des blondes) is a 1950 French drama film directed by André Hunebelle and starring Raymond Rouleau, Martine Carol and Claude Farell. It is part of the trilogy of films featuring reporter Georges Masse. It was preceded by Mission in Tangier in 1949 and followed by Massacre in Lace (1952).

Synopsis
Masse investigates the death of a woman who had been trying to gain information of drug-smuggling organisations in the Far East.

Partial cast
 Raymond Rouleau as Georges Masse
 Martine Carol as Olga Schneider
 Claude Farell as Suzanne Wilson
 Yves Vincent as Luigi Costelli
 Bernard La Jarrige as Petit Louis
 Henri Crémieux as M. Dubois
 Pierre Destailles as Lionel, le Voyageur
 Espanita Cortez as the Spanish Dancer
 Monique Darbaud as the Be Bop Dancer
 Martine Arden
 Madeleine Barbulée as Mme Dubois
 Anne-Marie Duverney as Anne-Marie
 Liliane Ernout
 Catherine Fath
 Claude Garbe
 Claude Winter
 Louis Bugette as the First Killer 
 Robert Le Béal as the Second Killer  
 Larbi Tounsi
 Françoise Lugagne as Janine Lambert  
 Anny Flore as the Singer  
 Ky Duyen as M. Dou  
 Robert Arnoux as Editor-in-chief
 Noël Roquevert as Commissioner Besnard

References

External links
 

1950 films
1950 drama films
Films directed by André Hunebelle
Films about journalists
Films with screenplays by Michel Audiard
French drama films
French black-and-white films
1950s French-language films
Pathé films
1950s French films